Robson Muchichwa (born 2 November 1975) is a Zimbabwean former footballer who played at both professional and international levels as a midfielder and or centre forward. Muchichwa started playing football in his Bulawayo, Zimbabwe Township of Phelandaba (also known as "No. 6") while attending Induba Primary School. He moved on to join Eagles FC juniors, the most prominent junior program in the Western Suburbs after the Highlanders F.C. and Zimbabwe Saints F.C. programs, based at White City Stadium. In his junior playing days he went by the moniker "Zimara", which most of his childhood friends still use today. Muchichwa last played club football for Benoni Premier United; he also earned one cap for the Zimbabwean national side in 2000.

References

1975 births
Living people
Kaizer Chiefs F.C. players
Association football midfielders
Zimbabwean footballers
Zimbabwe international footballers
Dynamos F.C. players
Zimbabwean expatriate footballers
Expatriate soccer players in South Africa